The Stoner criterion is a condition to be fulfilled for the ferromagnetic order to arise in a simplified model of a solid. It is named after Edmund Clifton Stoner.

Stoner model of ferromagnetism
 

Ferromagnetism ultimately stems from Pauli exclusion. The simplified model of a solid which is nowadays usually called the Stoner model, can be formulated in terms of dispersion relations for spin up and spin down electrons,

If  is fixed,  can be used to calculate the total energy of the system as a function of its polarization . It can be shown that for

the  state will spontaneously pass into a polarized one. This is the Stoner criterion, expressed in terms of the  density of states at the Fermi energy .

A non-zero  state may be favoured over  even before the Stoner criterion is fulfilled.

Relationship to the Hubbard model

The Stoner model can be obtained from the Hubbard model by applying the mean-field approximation. The particle density operators are written as their mean value  plus fluctuation  and the product of spin-up and spin-down fluctuations is neglected. We obtain

With the third term included, which was omitted in the definition above, we arrive at the better-known form of the Stoner criterion

Notes

References

 Stephen Blundell, Magnetism in Condensed Matter (Oxford Master Series in Physics). 
 
 
Ferromagnetism